The men's 200 metres was held on 2 September and 3 September as part of the athletics at the 1960 Summer Olympics, which were held in Rome. 74 athletes from 54 nations entered, but only 62 athletes from 47 nations ultimately competed. The maximum number of athletes per nation had been set at 3 since the 1930 Olympic Congress. The event was won by Livio Berruti of Italy, the first victory in the event by a nation outside of North America and snapping a five-Games winning streak (and two-Games medal sweep streak) by the United States. The Americans finished with a silver medal, by Lester Carney, to extend their medal streak to six Games. Abdoulaye Seye of France took bronze. Berruti's gold and Seye's bronze were the first medal for their nations in the men's 200 metres.

Background

This was the 13th appearance of the event, which was not held at the first Olympics in 1896 but has been on the program ever since. One of the six finalists from the 1956 Games returned: sixth-place finisher José da Conceição of Brazil. The favorite was American Ray Norton, the 1959 and 1960 AAU champion and 1959 Pan American Games winner. Italian Livio Berruti was the only man who had defeated Norton in any 200 metres race in 1959, and the home crowd in Rome hoped for a medal from him.

Afghanistan, the British West Indies, Fiji, Ghana, Kenya, and Morocco each made their debut in the event. The United States made its 13th appearance, the only nation to have competed at each edition of the 200 metres to date.

Competition format

The competition used the four round format introduced in 1920: heats, quarterfinals, semifinals, and a final. A significant change, however, was the introduction of the "fastest loser" system. Previously, advancement depended solely on the runners' place in their heat. The 1960 competition added advancement places to the fastest runners across the heats in the first round who did not advance based on place.

There were 12 heats of between 5 and 6 runners each (before withdrawals), with the top 2 men in each advancing to the quarterfinals along with the next 3 fastest overall. The quarterfinals consisted of 4 heats of 6 or 7 athletes each; the 3 fastest men in each heat advanced to the semifinals. There were 2 semifinals, each with 6 runners. In that round, the top 3 athletes advanced. The final had 6 runners. The races were run on a 400 metre track.

Records

Prior to the competition, the existing world and Olympic records were as follows.

Livio Berruti's hand-timed 20.5 seconds in the semifinal equalled the world record and set a new Olympic record; he equalled this time in the Final.

Schedule

All times are Central European Time (UTC+1)

Results

Heats

The top two runners in each of the 12 heats advanced, as well as the next three fastest runners from across all heats.

Heat 1

Heat 2

Heat 3

Heat 4

Heat 5

Heat 6

Heat 7

Heat 8

Heat 9

Heat 10

Heat 11

Heat 12

Quarterfinals

The first three in each quarterfinal qualified for the semifinals.

Quarterfinal 1

Quarterfinal 2

Quarterfinal 3

Quarterfinal 4

Semifinals

The first three in each semifinal qualified for the final.

Semifinal 1

Semifinal 2

Berruti tied the world record of 20.5 seconds.

Final

Berruti tied again the world record of 20.5 seconds

References

External links
Olympic Report 1960 Volume 2

M
200 metres at the Olympics
Men's events at the 1960 Summer Olympics